Roberts Raimo (born 10 April 1968) is a Latvian cross-country skier. He competed in the men's 10 kilometre classical event at the 1998 Winter Olympics.

References

External links
 

1968 births
Living people
Latvian male cross-country skiers
Olympic cross-country skiers of Latvia
Cross-country skiers at the 1998 Winter Olympics
Sportspeople from Riga
20th-century Latvian people